Une espérance nouvelle pour le Liban is a post-synodal apostolic exhortation of Pope John Paul II, signed on 10 May 1997 in Harissa-Daraoun, Lebanon. It came as the result of a synod of Lebanese Catholic bishops in Rome in November–December 1995.

References

External links 

 

Apostolic exhortations
1996 documents
Documents of Pope John Paul II
1996 in Christianity
Catholicism in Lebanon